Robert Peche (died 1126) was a medieval Bishop of Coventry.

Peche was elected about January 1121, and consecrated on 13 March 1121. He died on 22 August 1126. Little is known of his background, and his actual activity while bishop remains obscure. It is probable that Richard Peche, who became bishop of Coventry from 1161 to 1182 was his son.

Dugdale and Banks state Peche had two sons one of whom was the later Bishop of Lichfield Richard Peche adding credence to assertion of probable descent from Robert.

Citations

References

 
 
 

12th-century English Roman Catholic bishops
Bishops of Lichfield
1126 deaths
Year of birth unknown